Julie Jézéquel (born 26 March 1964) is a French actress and writer.

Filmography

Actress

Writer

Theater

Author

References

External links

1964 births
Living people
French film actresses
French television actresses
20th-century French actresses
21st-century French actresses